My Versions is the debut album of Swedish singer Robin Stjernberg who was formerly a member of the boyband What's Up! with Eric Saade and had placed second in Idol 2011.

Stjernberg had pre-released his first music single "All This Way" from the album on December 2, 2011. It was the winning song in the Idol competition also done by the winner Amanda Fondell in a separate version. The release of the album itself soon followed, being released on January 4, 2012, by Lionheart Music Group record label, topping the Swedish Albums Chart on week 2 dated January 13, 2012. It stayed at that position for one week.

Track listing 

"All This Way" (3:19)
"Dedication to My Ex (Miss That)" (2:17)
"Halo" (4:13)
"Let Me Entertain You" (3:53)
"You Raise Me Up" (2:42)
"In My Head" (3:01)
"Who You Are" (3:22)
"Breakeven" (4:26)
"Love Is Gone" (2:57)
"California King Bed" (3:49)

Charts

Weekly charts

Year-end charts

References

2012 debut albums